Mario Locksley Ford (born 26 June 1958) is a Bahamian former cricketer. Ford is a left-handed batsman who bowls right-arm medium pace and has represented the Bahamas national cricket team in 24 matches.

Ford made his debut for the Bahamas in the 2004 Americas Affiliates Championship against the Turks and Caicos Islands.	

Ford made his Twenty20 debut for the Bahamas against the Cayman Islands in the first round of the 2006 Stanford 20/20. He scored 25 runs from 14 balls. Ford played his second and final Twenty20 match for the Bahamas in the first round of the 2008 Stanford 20/20 against Jamaica, when he scored 8 runs from 8 balls, before being dismissed by David Bernard

Ford represented the Bahamas in the 2008 ICC World Cricket League Division Five, with his final appearance for the team against Norway.  Ford will represent the Bahamas in the 2010 ICC Americas Championship Division 1.

References

External links
Mario Ford at Cricinfo
Mario Ford at CricketArchive

1958 births
Living people
Bahamian cricketers